Arturo Dandan (born 28 December 1937) is a Filipino weightlifter. He competed in the men's bantamweight event at the 1968 Summer Olympics.

References

1937 births
Living people
Filipino male weightlifters
Olympic weightlifters of the Philippines
Weightlifters at the 1968 Summer Olympics
Sportspeople from Manila
20th-century Filipino people